XHBZC-TDT virtual channel 8, known on-air as Canal 8, is an educational and public television station owned and operated by the government of the State of Baja California Sur in La Paz. It is part of IERT, the Instituto Estatal de Radio y Televisión, and produces local programming including news and public affairs shows. It also airs programming from Canal Once.

History
XHBZC received its permit in June 1994. In 2015, the station moved to digital on channel 30, using PSIP to appear to receivers as channel 8.1.

References

Public television in Mexico
Television channels and stations established in 1994
Mass media in La Paz, Baja California Sur
Television stations in Baja California Sur
1994 establishments in Mexico